Sept-Sorts is a commune in the Seine-et-Marne department in the Île-de-France region in north-central France, east of Paris. It was the site of the Sept-Sorts ramming attack.

Name
The name Sept-Sorts comes from Latin septum, seven and ancient French sourt, spring. Sept Sorts means seven springs.

Demographics
Inhabitants of Sept-Sorts are called Septsortais.

See also
Communes of the Seine-et-Marne department

References

External links

1999 Land Use, from IAURIF (Institute for Urban Planning and Development of the Paris-Île-de-France région) 

Communes of Seine-et-Marne